The Warm Moods is an album by American jazz saxophonist Ben Webster featuring tracks recorded in 1960 for the Reprise label. The album was the label's first non-Frank Sinatra release.

Reception

In the Los Angeles Times, Leonard Feather wrote The Warm Moods demonstrated why Webster was "among the immortals", commenting that his tenor saxophone playing "makes every song seem beautiful, whether the task is easy (as in 'Nancy,' 'There's No You,' 'But Beautiful,' 'It Was So Beautiful') or near impossible (as in 'The Sweetheart of Sigma Chi' and 'The Whiffenpoof Song')." Scott Yanow wrote in his review for AllMusic: "even when simply stating the melody, Webster brings out unexpected beauty in the songs. His tone has never been accurately duplicated".

Track listing
 "The Sweetheart of Sigma Chi" (Bryan Stokes, Dudley Vernor) -  2:23     
 "Stella by Starlight" (Ned Washington, Victor Young) - 2:59     
 "With Every Breath I Take" (Ralph Rainger, Leo Robin) - 3:02     
 "Accent on Youth" (Vee Lawnhurst, Tot Seymour) - 2:57     
 "But Beautiful" (Johnny Burke, Jimmy Van Heusen) - 2:50     
 "Time After Time" (Sammy Cahn, Jule Styne) - 3:08     
 "Nancy (With the Laughing Face)" (Van Heusen, Phil Silvers) - 3:09     
 "I'm Beginning to See the Light" (Duke Ellington, Don George, Johnny Hodges, Harry James) - 2:44     
 "It Was So Beautiful" (Harry Barris, Arthur Freed) - 3:21     
 "The Whiffenpoof Song" (Tod Galloway, Meade Minnigerode, George S. Pomeroy) - 2:23     
 "It's Easy to Remember" (Lorenz Hart, Richard Rodgers) - 3:08     
 "There's No You" (Tom Adair, Hal Hopper) - 3:16

Personnel 
Ben Webster - tenor saxophone
Donn Trenner - piano
Alfred Lustgarten, Lisa Minghetti - violin
Cecil Figelski - viola
Armond Kaproff - cello
Don Bagley - bass
Frank Capp - drums

References 

1961 albums
Ben Webster albums
Reprise Records albums